Caryocolum pullatella is a moth of the family Gelechiidae. It is found in Austria, Italy, Denmark, Poland, Estonia, Latvia, Norway, Sweden, Finland, Ukraine, Russia, Japan, Alaska, Canada and the northern United States, south to Arizona in the west.

The length of the forewings is 5-6.5 mm. The forewings are mottled dark brown with two median white patches in the cell at one-fifth and the middle. Adults have been recorded on wing from mid-May to mid-October, probably in one generation per year.

References

Moths described in 1848
pullatella
Moths of Asia
Moths of Europe
Moths of North America